The Danville Community School District is a rural public school district headquartered in Danville, Iowa.  It is mainly in Des Moines County, with a small area in Henry County, and serves the city of Danville and the surrounding rural areas.

Schools
The district operates two schools in a single facility in Danville:
 Danville Elementary School
 Danville Junior-Senior High School

Danville High School

Athletics
The Bears compete in the Southeast Iowa Superconference in the following sports:
Cross Country
Volleyball
Football
Basketball
Boys' 2-time Class 2A State Champions (2001, 2002)
Track and Field
Golf
Soccer
Baseball
Softball

Students from Danville can also participate in bowling with Mount Pleasant.

See also
List of school districts in Iowa 
List of high schools in Iowa

References

External links
 Danville Community School District

School districts in Iowa
Education in Des Moines County, Iowa
Education in Henry County, Iowa
1963 establishments in Iowa
School districts established in 1963